Issa and Gurgura Liberation Front (IGLF) was a political faction in eastern Ethiopia, led by Riyaale Ahmed Formed in 1991. IGLF, which is based amongst the Issa and Gurgura clans in northern Hararghe, evolved out of the Iil Tire division of the Western Somali Liberation Front. During its initial period of existence, its armed members clashed many times with the Somali National Movement along the Ethiopia-Somalia border.

Around 1992 IGLF was involved in clashes with the dominant Ethiopian People's Revolutionary Democratic Front (EPRDF). During this period IGLF sabotaged the Addis Ababa - Djibouti Railway.

Defunct political parties in Ethiopia
Factions of the Ethiopian Civil War
Rebel groups in Ethiopia